The Communauté de communes du pays d'Héricourt is a communauté de communes, an intercommunal structure, in the Haute-Saône and Doubs departments, in the Bourgogne-Franche-Comté region of France. Since January 2019, it consists of 23 communes. It has its administrative offices at Héricourt. Its area is 163.6 km2, and its population was 21,078 in 2019.

Presidents 

 Jean-Michel Villaumé, from 2000 to 2007.
 Fernand Burkhalter, since 2007, re-elected in 2014 and 2020.

Composition
The communauté de communes consists of the following 23 communes, of which three (Aibre, Laire and Le Vernoy) in the Doubs department:

Aibre
Belverne
Brevilliers
Chagey
Châlonvillars
Champey
Chavanne
Chenebier
Coisevaux
Courmont
Couthenans
Échenans-sous-Mont-Vaudois
Étobon
Héricourt
Laire
Luze
Mandrevillars
Saulnot
Trémoins
Verlans
Le Vernoy
Villers-sur-Saulnot
Vyans-le-Val

References

External links 
Official website of the Communauté de communes du Pays d'Héricourt

Hericourt
Hericourt
Hericourt